Boswellia elegans is a species of trees in the order Sapindales, found in Africa.

References

External links 

 Boswellia elegans at The Plant List
 Boswellia elegans at Tropicos

elegans
Plants described in 1904
Flora of Africa
Sapindales